Miss America 2017, the 90th Miss America pageant, was held at the Boardwalk Hall in Atlantic City, New Jersey, on Sunday, September 11, 2016. The event was broadcast by ABC in the United States, the first in the network's newest agreement to carry the pageant until 2019, with Dick Clark Productions producing the ceremony.

Betty Cantrell (Miss Georgia 2015) crowned her successor, Miss Arkansas 2016, Savvy Shields, at the end of the two-hour nationally televised event.

Overview

Preliminary judges
The panel of preliminary competition judges included actress, Katherine Bailess; Miss America 1966, Debby Bryant Berge; musician, Rob Bowman; Dr. Jennifer Caudle; television host, Nicole Lapin; strategist, Deanna Siller; and CEO of Galvanized Media, David Zinczenko.

Final night judges
The panel of judges on the final night of competition included singer, Ciara; businessman, Mark Cuban; Olympic gold medalist, Gabby Douglas; actress, Sara Foster; actress, Laura Marano; country singer, Cole Swindell; and Miss America 1985, Sharlene Wells Hawkes.

Results

Placements

* - America's Choice

Awards

Preliminary awards

Children's Miracle Network (CMN) National Miracle Maker awards

Quality of Life awards

STEM Scholarship awards

Duke of Edinburgh awards

Other awards

Contestants
The Miss America 2017 contestants are:

References

2017
2016 beauty pageants
2016 in New Jersey
September 2016 events in the United States
2016 in the United States
Events in Atlantic City, New Jersey